Kārlis Kepke (born 6 November 1890, date of death unknown) was a Latvian cyclist. He competed in two events at the 1912 Summer Olympics for the Russian Empire.

References

External links
 

1890 births
Year of death missing
Latvian male cyclists
Russian male cyclists
Olympic cyclists of Russia
Cyclists at the 1912 Summer Olympics
Sportspeople from Riga